She's Got to Be a Saint is a studio album by country music artist Ray Price. It was released in 1973 by Columbia Records (catalog no. KC-32033).

The album debuted on Billboard magazine's country album chart on April 14, 1973, peaked at No. 4, and remained on the chart for a total of 14 weeks. It included the No. 1 hit single, "She's Got to Be a Saint".

AllMusic gave the album three stars. Critic Greg Adams called it "short on variety but nicely consistent for fans of Price's ballad style."

Track listing
Side A
 "She's Got to Be a Saint"
 "Turn Around, Look at Me"
 "Sunday"
 "Nobody Wins"
 "Everything That's Beautiful (Reminds Me of You)"
 "Goin' Away"

Side B
 "Help Me"
 "My Baby's Gone"
 "Enough for You"
 "The Sweetest Tie"
 "I Keep Looking Back"

References

1973 albums
Ray Price (musician) albums
Columbia Records albums